Práxedes Giner Durán (February 15, 1893 – May 13, 1978) was a Mexican military official, politician, and member of the then-dominant Institutional Revolutionary Party (PRI). He participated in the Mexican Revolution as a part of Pancho Villa's famed División del Norte and became an icon in his home state. He was the Governor of Chihuahua from 1962 until 1968.

References

1893 births
1978 deaths
Governors of Chihuahua (state)
Politicians from Chihuahua (state)
Institutional Revolutionary Party politicians
Mexican military personnel
People of the Mexican Revolution
20th-century Mexican politicians
People from Camargo, Chihuahua